Fourmile Lake (or Four Mile Lake) is a reservoir located  above sea level in Klamath County, Oregon, United States.
The lake is bordered by Sky Lakes Wilderness, and is in the Winema National Forest.

History
In 1898, the Fish Lake Water Company was established to help irrigate the Rogue Valley. The company proposed create Fourmile Lake and enlarge nearby Fish Lake for added water storage. The Fourmile Lake Dam was constructed in 1906, while Fish Lake was completed in 1908. The two lakes were connected in 1915 by the Cascade Canal, taking water from Fourmile Lake over the Cascade Divide to Fish Lake, supplementing Little Butte Creek.
In 1955, the dam was repaired, and a new spillway was added.

Statistics

Fauna
Rainbow Trout, Kokanee, Brook Trout, and Lake trout are common in the lake. The Bushy-tailed Woodrat and Golden-mantled Ground Squirrel, species of least concern, can be found around the lake.

Recreation
The lake is included in the Winema National Forest.
The Sky Lakes Wilderness borders the lake, and a trail leads into it. One campground is located near the lake.
Popular activities include fishing, swimming, and boating.

See also
 List of lakes in Oregon

References

Reservoirs in Oregon
Lakes of Klamath County, Oregon
Buildings and structures in Klamath County, Oregon
Protected areas of Klamath County, Oregon
Fremont–Winema National Forest
1906 establishments in Oregon